This is the discography of Ludmilla, a Brazilian singer-songwriter, comprising two studio albums, two extended plays, twenty singles and a range of music videos. In early 2014, she signed to Warner Music Brazil, and removed the "MC" name before releasing her first album with the label.

Albums

Studio albums

Live albums

Mixtape

Extended plays

Singles

As lead artist

As featured artist

Promotional singles

Other appearances

Music videos

References

Discographies of Brazilian artists
Latin music discographies